The Princess in the Chest, also known as The Princess in the Coffin (Danish: Prinsessen i Kisten) is a Danish fairy tale. Andrew Lang included it in The Pink Fairy Book.

Another tale of this type is La Ramée and the Phantom.

Synopsis
A king left his queen because they were childless and told her if she did not have a child by the time he returned, in a year, he would part with her.  An old woman advised her to eat a bud from a bush.  She would have a daughter.  The old woman would give her a nurse, who must raise the girl without anyone else seeing her until she was fourteen.  The queen did as she said, but when the fourteen years were one day short of complete, the king went to see her.  The princess said that now she would die.  The king had his choice of a pestilence, a long and bloody war, or putting her body in a wooden coffin and setting a sentinel over it every day for a year.  He did not believe it, but chose the coffin.  The next morning, she was dead.  He did as she directed, but every night, the sentinel vanished.  Soon, the story was that the princess's ghost ate whoever it was, and soldiers deserted rather than take on the duty.  The king got more by offering rewards, but no one ever received it.

One day, a smith named Christian came to the capital looking for work.  Soldiers got him to agree to the job, because he had gotten drunk. When the drink wore off, he tried to flee, but a little man stopped him and told him to stay in the pulpit until the coffin lid slammed.  He went into the pulpit, and at midnight, the princess came out and howled, demanding the sentinel.  She saw him in the pulpit but could not get up after him.  Finally, she had to go back to the coffin.

The next day, the king gave him a reward and a good meal, where he had plenty to drink, until the king offered twice the gold, and Christian agreed to stay the next night, too.  He tried to flee, and the little man stopped him again, telling him to stay in front of the altar and hold the prayer book there.  The princess rushed up to the pulpit that night; when she did not find him, she shrieked that war and pestilence would begin, but then she saw him and could not reach him.  She had to go back to the coffin, but she was less ugly that night than the one before.

The third day, Christian agreed when drunk again, but only for half the kingdom.  He tried to sneak off again, this time earlier to avoid the little man, and through a window.  The little man still stopped him, but this time he was to lie down by the coffin and climb inside as soon as she left it.  She came out at midnight and shrieked that war and pestilence would come.  She eventually found him in the coffin but was unable to reach him.  Despite her attempts to threaten and coax him out of the coffin, he did not move.  Then she went away and soft music came.  Christian heard a mass of thanksgiving being said for the deliverance.  At dawn he came out and found the princess alive.  She told him the curse was broken and if he agreed, they would marry. If not, she would go to a convent and he could never marry another as long as she lived (for the service he'd heard was a marriage ceremony of the dead).  Christian agreed to marry.  The king consented and made good on his promise to give Christian half his kingdom, eventually inheriting its entirety on the king's death.

Analysis

Tale type 
The tale is classified in the Aarne-Thompson-Uther Index as tale type ATU 307, "The Princess in the Shroud" or "The Princess in the Coffin": a cursed princess or woman comes out of her grave or coffin at night to attack people. These tales are, according to scholarship, more commonly collected among East European populations, especially in Russia.

German scholar Kurt Ranke supposed that the tale type originated from Eastern European legends about vampirism.

Distribution 
The tale type is also present in the Ukrainian tale corpus, with a number between 22 and 28 variants collected under the banner The Princess Rising from the Grave.

According to professor Jūratė Šlekonytė, type 307 is "popular all over Lithuania", with 222 variants registered.

See also
The Twelve Dancing Princesses
Kate Crackernuts

References

Danish fairy tales
Fictional princesses
Female characters in fairy tales
ATU 300-399